Pere Riba Madrid (born 7 April 1988) is a Spanish former professional tennis player. Riba competed on the ATP Challenger Tour and the ATP World Tour, both in singles and doubles. He reached his highest ATP singles ranking, No. 65, on May 16, 2011, and his highest ATP doubles ranking, No. 81, on June 7, 2010.

Professional Career
At one point in his career he ranked as the youngest Spaniard in the top 100, but injury (leading to hip surgery) saw his ranking drop to as low 843 in early 2013. Riba was coached by former Spanish player Jordi Arrese, and Juanse Martínez.

Coaching career
He is the co-founder of ELITE TENNIS TEAM with Julián Alonso based in Barcelona (Club Tennis Els Gorchs) focusing on junior development and professional tennis players like Qinwen Zheng, whom he is currently coaching and Arantxa Rus.

Futures and Challenger finals

Singles: 37 (13–24)

Doubles: 14 (8–6)

Singles performance timeline

References

External links

 
 

1988 births
Living people
Spanish male tennis players
Tennis players from Barcelona
Spanish tennis coaches